

The RB-1 Ray's Rebel is an American two-seat light sporting aircraft designed and built by Ray Bishop of Norton, Ohio.

Design and development
The Ray's Rebel is a braced low-wing monoplane with a welded steel-tube fuselage covered in fabric. The wing is an all-wood construction covered with Ceconite, it has endplates on the wing tips and frise-type ailerons but has no flaps or trim tabs. Ray's Rebel is powered by a  Lycoming O-290-G air-cooled piston engine driving a two-bladed fixed pitch tractor propeller. The landing gear is a fixed tailwheel type with a glassfibre fairing over the wheel. The enclosed cockpit has two side-by-side configuration seats under a rearward-sliding canopy. Bishop started designing the aircraft in October 1954 and started construction in February 1955, fifteen years later it was completed and now registered N971RB. Roy's Rebel first flew on 28 March 1970.

Specifications

References

Notes

Bibliography

1970s United States civil utility aircraft
Homebuilt aircraft
Low-wing aircraft
Single-engined tractor aircraft
Aircraft manufactured in the United States
Aircraft first flown in 1970